Skegby is a hamlet within the Marnham civil parish in Bassetlaw district, of the county of Nottinghamshire, England. It lies in the north east of the county, south east within the district and centre south of the parish. There are two listed buildings in the area.

Toponymy 
The name "Skegby" has of Norse origins, the by(r) or dwelling of Skeggir, who is translated as "the bearded one." Skegby was recorded in the Domesday Book as Scachebi.

Geography

Location 
Skegby is surrounded by the following local areas:

 Darlton to the north
 Normanton-on-Trent to the south
 Low Marnham and High Marnham to the east
 Tuxford to the west.

Settlement 
This is a small hamlet centrally located within the centre south of the parish, based around Skegby Road. It is reached from the Marnham villages, without exiting the parish, by means of Polly Taylor's Road. It has 3 farms and 3 cottages. A notable residence in the area is Skegby Manor which is a listed building.

Governance and demography 
The three settlements Low Marnham, High Marnham and Skegby are combined as Marnham parish for administrative identity.

It is managed at the first level of public administration by Marnham with Normanton-on-Trent Parish Council.

At district level, the wider area is managed by Bassetlaw District Council.

Nottinghamshire County Council provides the highest level strategic services locally.

History

Medieval history 
Roger de Busli at the time of the Domesday (1086) was the key landowner of the Marnham manor as well as beyond. From this, William de Kewles became lord of these manors, and from this they passed to the Chaworths. Elizabeth, the daughter and heiress of Sir George Chaworth, carried the holdings through marriage to Sir William Cope. By 1853 Earl Brownlow was the principal owner and lord of the manor of Marnham.

Later history 
Skegby Manor was a  farm. It was held by Charles Francis Wade in the mid 1800s. Their son Richard Wade became a partner in the Sharpe & Wade solicitor firm based in Market Deeping for many years, and run by several  generations of the Wade family. He was also Lord of the Manor in Skegby in 1927. Hugh Wade was one of Richard's sons, and was a noted 1920s-40s musician and writer.

In 1835, White's Directory reported three farm houses and three cottages in Skegby.

Landmarks

Listed buildings 
There is only one listed residence in the area, Skegby Manor. It is listed at Grade II, and dates from the 18th century. Its pigeoncote auxiliary building is also listed.

References 

Hamlets in Nottinghamshire
Bassetlaw District